Mikhail Sukharev (born 12 March 1953) is a Russian former swimmer. He competed in two events at the 1972 Summer Olympics for the Soviet Union.

References

1953 births
Living people
Russian male swimmers
Olympic swimmers of the Soviet Union
Swimmers at the 1972 Summer Olympics
Sportspeople from Astrakhan
Soviet male swimmers